P. J. Keefe was the head football coach for the Middlebury College Panthers football team from 1910 through 1912. He compiled a record of 2–16–2.

Head coaching record

References

Year of birth missing
Year of death missing
Middlebury Panthers football coaches